In cricket, a century is a score of 100 or more runs in a single innings by a batsman. The term is also included in "century partnership" which occurs when two batsmen add 100 runs to the team total when they are batting together. A century is regarded as a landmark score for batsmen and a player's number of centuries is generally recorded in their career statistics. Scoring a century is loosely equivalent in merit to a bowler taking a five-wicket haul, and is commonly referred to as a ton or hundred. Scores of more than 200 runs are still statistically counted as a century, although these scores are referred to as double (200–299 runs), triple (300–399 runs), and quadruple centuries (400–499 runs), and so on. Reaching 50 runs in an innings is known as a half-century. 

Scoring a century at Lord's earns the batsman a place on the Lord's honours boards.

Earliest known centuries
Centuries were uncommon until the late 19th century because of the difficulties in batting on pitches that had only rudimentary preparation and were fully exposed to the elements. There is doubt about the earliest known century, but the most definite claim belongs to John Minshull who scored 107 for the Duke of Dorset's XI v Wrotham at Sevenoaks Vine on 31 August 1769. This 
was a minor match.

The first definite century in a top-class match was scored by John Small when he made 136 for Hampshire v Surrey at Broadhalfpenny Down in July 1775. The earliest known century partnership was recorded in 1767 between two Hambledon batsmen who added 192 for the first wicket against Caterham. It is believed they were Tom Sueter and Edward "Curry" Aburrow.

When Hambledon played Kent at Broadhalfpenny in August 1768, the Reading Mercury reported: "what is very remarkable, one Mr Small, of Petersfield, fetched above seven score notches off his own bat". Unfortunately it is not known if Small did this in one innings or if it was his match total. Hambledon batsmen Tom Sueter and George Leer are the first two players definitely known to have shared a century partnership when they made 128 for the first wicket against Surrey at Broadhalfpenny Down in September 1769.

Highest number of centuries

First-class cricket

W. G. Grace was the first batsman to score 100 career centuries in first-class cricket, reaching the milestone in 1895. His career total of 124 centuries was subsequently passed by Jack Hobbs, whose total of 199 first-class centuries is the current record.

Test cricket

The first century in Test cricket was scored by Charles Bannerman who scored 165 before retiring hurt, in the first ever Test between Australia and England, played at the Melbourne Cricket Ground from 15 to 19 March 1877. The first century partnership in Test cricket was between W. G. Grace and A. P. Lucas, batting for England, in the first innings of the only Test match between England and Australia on the Australians' 1880 tour of England, played at the Kennington Oval (6–8 September 1880).

The current holder of the record for most centuries in Test cricket is Sachin Tendulkar of India, who has scored 51 centuries.

One Day International cricket

The first One Day International (ODI) century was scored by Denis Amiss, who amassed 103 runs against Australia at Old Trafford in 1972 (the second official ODI on record). Sachin Tendulkar currently holds the record for most ODI centuries, having scored 49 ODI Centuries, followed by Virat Kohli with 46 ODI centuries, Ricky Ponting with 30 centuries, and Rohit Sharma 30 centuries.

Twenty20 International cricket

The first Twenty20 International (T20I) century was scored by Chris Gayle who amassed 117 runs against South Africa at Johannesburg in the very first match of ICC World Twenty20 tournament in 2007.  Rohit Sharma currently holds the record for most T20I centuries, having scored 4 T20I Centuries.

Fastest centuries
The fastest recorded century in Test cricket in terms of balls faced is held by Brendon McCullum, who scored 100 runs from 54 balls against Australia in 2016 at Christchurch, New Zealand, in his final test, beating the previous record of 56 held jointly by Viv Richards and Misbah-ul-Haq. The record for the fastest century in first-class cricket in terms of time taken, in genuine match conditions rather than in contrived circumstances with deliberately weak bowling, is held by Percy Fender, who scored 100 in 35 minutes for Surrey against Northamptonshire in a County Championship match in 1920. The record for the fastest recorded century in terms of balls faced in first-class cricket is held by David Hookes, who scored 102 runs from 34 balls for South Australia vs. Victoria in a Sheffield Shield match in 1982. Chris Gayle holds the record for the fastest century in Twenty20, during an Indian Premier League in April 2013, reaching the milestone off only 30 balls.

In One day International cricket (ODI), the fastest century is held by South African batsman AB De Villiers. De Villiers' century came up in just 31 balls against the West Indies in the 2nd ODI at Johannesburg on 18 January 2015. De Villiers' hundred included 8 fours and 16 sixes. Corey Anderson (New Zealand) is second, scoring a 36-ball century against West Indies in Queenstown on 1 January 2014. Shahid Afridi (Pakistan) is third. with his 37-ball century against Sri Lanka being scored in Nairobi on 4 October 1996.

David Miller of South Africa hit the fastest century in Twenty20 international cricket against Bangladesh on 29 October 2017. Miller brought up his century in just 35 balls. Rohit Sharma of India equalled the record of the fastest century in T20 international cricket against Sri Lanka on 22 December 2017. Czech Republic's Sudesh Wickramasekara reached the three-figure mark in 35 balls against Turkey on 30 August 2019, equalling Rohit Sharma's and David Miller's joint-fastest T20I hundred.

On 22 April 2019, Scottish cricketer George Munsey scored 100 in 25 balls playing for Gloucestershire 2nd XI; his 39-ball total of 147 included 20 sixes.

List of cricketers who have scored centuries in all three international formats

See also
 List of cricketers by number of international centuries scored
 Nervous nineties

References

Cricket terminology
Batting (cricket)
Cricket records and statistics